The Chicago Board of Trade Battery was an artillery battery that served in the Union Army during the American Civil War.

Service
The Chicago Board of Trade Battery was mustered into service at Chicago, Illinois, on August 1, 1862. It was sponsored by the Chicago Board of Trade, from which the battery took its name.

In March 1863, the battery changed from mounted field artillery to "flying" horse artillery, the only battery of flying artillery in the Union Western armies. The battery was mustered out on June 30, 1865, in Chicago.

Total strength and casualties
During its term of service, the battery lost 10 enlisted men killed in action or died of their wounds and 9 enlisted men who died of disease, for a total of 19 fatalities.

Commanders
Captain James H. Stokes (1816–1890) – mustered out August 22, 1864, upon expiration of his term of enlistment
Captain George I. Robinson – mustered out with the battery following the war

Notable soldiers
 Phil Auten (1840–1919) – business executive and co-owner of the Pittsburgh Pirates

See also
List of Illinois Civil War Units
Illinois in the American Civil War

Notes

References

External links
 Battle of Stone's River blog site
 Historical Sketch of the Chicago board of Trade Battery 1902
Chicago Board of Trade Battery at Chickamuga

Units and formations of the Union Army from Illinois
Artillery units and formations of the American Civil War
Chicago Board of Trade
1861 establishments in Illinois
Military units and formations established in 1861
Military units and formations disestablished in 1864